In India, the Mental Health Care Act 2017 was passed on 7 April 2017 and came into force from 29 May 2018. The act effectively decriminalized attempted suicide which was punishable under Section 309 of the Indian Penal Code. The law was described in its opening paragraph as "An Act to provide for mental healthcare and services for persons with mental illness and to protect, promote and fulfill the rights of such persons during delivery of mental healthcare and services and for matters connected therewith or incidental thereto." This Act superseded the previously existing Mental Health Act, 1987 that was passed on 22 May 1987.

It states that mental illness be determined "in accordance with nationally and internationally accepted medical standards (including the latest edition of the International Classification of Disease of the World Health Organization) as may be notified by the Central Government." Additionally, the Act asserts that no person or authority shall classify an individual as a person with mental illness unless in directly in relation with treatment of the illness.

Revisions made from the Mental Health Act 1987 
 The Mental Healthcare Act 2017 aims at decriminalising the Attempt to Commit Suicide by seeking to ensure that the individuals who have attempted suicide are offered opportunities for rehabilitation from the government as opposed to being tried or punished for the attempt. 
 The Act seeks to fulfill India's international obligation pursuant to the Convention on Rights of Persons with Disabilities and its Optional Protocol.
 It looks to empower persons suffering from mental illness, thus marking a departure from the Mental Health Act 1987. The 2017 Act recognises the agency of people with mental illness, allowing them to make decisions regarding their health, given that they have the appropriate knowledge to do so. 
 The Act aims to safeguard the rights of the people with mental illness, along with access to healthcare and treatment without discrimination from the government. Additionally, insurers are now bound to make provisions for medical insurance for the treatment of mental illness on the same basis as is available for the treatment of physical ailments. 
 The Mental Health Care Act 2017 includes provisions for the registration of mental health related institutions and for the regulation of the sector. These measures include the necessity of setting up mental health establishments across the country to ensure that no person with mental illness will have to travel far for treatment, as well as the creation of a mental health review board which will act as a regulatory body.
 The Act has restricted the usage of Electroconvulsive therapy (ECT) to be used only in cases of emergency, and along with muscle relaxants and anaesthesia. Further, ECT has additionally been prohibited to be used as viable therapy for minors. 
 The responsibilities of other agencies such as the police with respect to people with mental illness has been outlined in the 2017 Act.
 The Mental Health Care Act 2017 has additionally vouched to tackle stigma of mental illness, and has outlined some measures on how to achieve the same.

References

External links
 Mental Healthcare Act notified, attempting suicide no longer a crime in India

Acts of the Parliament of India 2017
Mental health in India
Law of India